Roy Allen Foster (born May 24, 1960) is a former professional American football offensive lineman.

High school career
Foster prepped at Taft High School in Woodland Hills, California and Shawnee Mission West High School in Overland Park, Kansas.

College career
Foster played for the University of Southern California (USC) and was selected to 1981 College Football All-America Team (Consensus selection), and the 1980 College Football All-America Team Foster was the first winner of The Morris Trophy for being the top offensive or defensive lineman in the Pacific-8 conference.  He is one of only three Pac-12 Offensive lineman (along with Lincoln Kennedy and Alex Mack) to win the award twice.

Professional career
Foster was a first round pick of the Miami Dolphins in the 1982 NFL Draft.  He was a two-time Pro Bowler, in 1985 and 1986, and played in two Super Bowls. He retired with the San Francisco 49ers in 1993. He is the only offensive lineman to have blocked for Joe Montana, Steve Young, and Dan Marino.  He also caught a touchdown pass from Dan Marino.

References

External links
 

1960 births
Living people
American football offensive guards
Miami Dolphins players
San Francisco 49ers players
USC Trojans football players
All-American college football players
American Conference Pro Bowl players
Players of American football from Los Angeles
Sportspeople from Overland Park, Kansas
Players of American football from Kansas
African-American players of American football
William Howard Taft Charter High School alumni
21st-century African-American people
20th-century African-American sportspeople